Olympia is a painting by Édouard Manet, first exhibited at the 1865 Paris Salon, which shows a nude woman ("Olympia") lying on a bed being brought flowers by a servant. Olympia was modelled by Victorine Meurent and Olympia's servant by the art model Laure. Olympia's confrontational gaze caused shock and astonishment when the painting was first exhibited because a number of details in the picture identified her as a prostitute. The French government acquired the painting in 1890 after a public subscription organized by Claude Monet. The painting is on display at the Musée d'Orsay, Paris.

Content 
What shocked contemporary audiences was not Olympia's nudity, nor the presence of her fully clothed maid, but her confrontational gaze and a number of details identifying her as a demi-mondaine or prostitute. These include the orchid in her hair, her bracelet, pearl earrings and the oriental shawl on which she lies, symbols of wealth and sensuality. The black ribbon around her neck, in stark contrast with her pale flesh, and her cast-off slipper underline the voluptuous atmosphere. "Olympia" was a name associated with prostitutes in 1860s Paris.

The painting is modelled after Titian's Venus of Urbino (c. 1534). Whereas the left hand of Titian's Venus is curled and appears to entice, Olympia's left hand appears to block, which has been interpreted as symbolic of her role as a prostitute, granting or restricting access to her body in return for payment. Manet replaced the little dog (symbol of fidelity) in Titian's painting with a black cat, a creature associated with nocturnal promiscuity. The aroused posture of the cat was provocative; in French, chatte (cat) is slang for female genitalia. Olympia disdainfully ignores the flowers presented to her by her servant, probably a gift from a client. Some have suggested that she is looking in the direction of the door, as her client barges in unannounced.

The painting deviates from the academic canon in its style, characterized by broad, quick brushstrokes, studio lighting that eliminates mid-tones, large color surfaces and shallow depth. Unlike the smooth idealized nude of Alexandre Cabanel's La naissance de Vénus, also painted in 1863, Olympia is a real woman whose nakedness is emphasized by the harsh lighting. The canvas alone is 	130.5 × 190 cm (51.4 × 74.8 inches), which is rather large. Most paintings that were this size depicted historical or mythological events, so the size of the work, among other factors, caused surprise. Finally, Olympia is fairly thin by the artistic standards of the time. Charles Baudelaire thought thinness was more indecent than fatness. 

The model for Olympia, Victorine Meurent, would have been recognized by viewers of the painting because she was well known in Paris circles.  She started modeling when she was sixteen years old and she also was an accomplished painter in her own right. Some of her paintings were exhibited in the Paris Salon. The familiarity with the identity of the model was a major reason this painting was considered shocking to viewers.  A well known woman currently living in modern-day Paris could not simultaneously represent a historical or mythological woman.

Critical reaction 

Though Manet's The Luncheon on the Grass (Le déjeuner sur l'herbe) sparked controversy in 1863, his Olympia stirred an even bigger uproar when it was first exhibited at the 1865 Paris Salon. Conservatives condemned the work as "immoral" and "vulgar". Journalist Antonin Proust later recalled, "If the canvas of the Olympia was not destroyed, it is only because of the precautions that were taken by the administration." The critics and the public condemned the work alike. Even Émile Zola was reduced to disingenuously commenting on the work's formal qualities rather than acknowledging the subject matter, "You wanted a nude, and you chose Olympia, the first that came along". He paid tribute to Manet's honesty, however: "When our artists give us Venuses, they correct nature, they lie. Édouard Manet asked himself why lie, why not tell the truth; he introduced us to Olympia, this fille of our time, whom you meet on the sidewalks."

Olympia's maid 

Although originally overlooked, the figure of the maid in the painting, modelled by a woman named Laure, has become a topic of discussion among contemporary scholars. As T. J. Clark recounts of a friend's disbelief in the revised 1990 version of The Painting of Modern Life: "you've written about the white woman on the bed for fifty pages and more, and hardly mentioned the black woman alongside her." Olympia was created 15 years after slavery had been abolished in France and its empire, but negative stereotypes of black people persisted among some elements of French society. In some cases, the white prostitute in the painting was described using racially charged language. According to Maria Rutledge, "references to Blackness thus invaded the image of white Olympia, turning her into the caricatural and grotesque animal that Black people are frequently made to represent in the nineteenth century."

Many critics have applauded Manet in his use of white and black in the painting, an alternative to the tradition of chiaroscuro. Charles Bernheimer has responded,

According to Timothy Paul, some black feminists, including Lorraine O' Grady, have argued that it is not for artistic convention that Manet included Laure but to create an ideological binary between black and white, good and bad, clean and dirty and as such "inevitably reformulates the Cartesian perspectival logic that allows whiteness to function as the only subject of consideration". When paired with a lighter skin tone, the Black female model stands in as signifier to all of the racial stereotypes of the West.

Confrontational gaze and oppositional gaze 
In Lorraine O'Grady's essay titled "Olympia's Maid: Reclaiming Black Female Subjectivity", she asserts, "Olympia's maid, like all other 'peripheral Negroes, is a robot conveniently made to disappear into the background drapery. While the confrontational gaze of Olympia is often referenced as the pinnacle of defiance toward patriarchy, the oppositional gaze of Olympia's maid is ignored; she is part of the background with little to no attention given to the critical role of her presence.

O'Grady points out that we know she represents 'Jezebel and Mammy' "and best of all, she is not a real person", rather she is object to the objectified and excluded from sexual difference according to Freudian theory. While Olympia looks directly at the viewer, her maid, too, is looking back. In her essay "Mammy, Jezebel, Sapphire and Their Homegirls: Developing an Oppositional Gaze toward the Images of Black Women", Catherine West concludes that by claiming an oppositional gaze we can identify, criticize, resist and transform these and other oppressive images of Black women.

Events 
In January 2016, a Luxembourg performance artist, Deborah De Robertis, lay on the floor in front of the painting nude and mimicked the pose of the subject. She was arrested for indecent exposure.

Precedents 
In part, the painting was inspired by Titian's Venus of Urbino (c. 1534), which in turn derives from Giorgione's Sleeping Venus (c. 1510). The Titian has two fully clothed women, presumably servants, in the background. Léonce Bénédite was the first art historian to explicitly acknowledge the similarity to the Venus of Urbino in 1897. There is also some similarity to Francisco Goya's La maja desnuda (c. 1800).

There were also pictorial precedents for a nude white female, often pictured with a black female servant, such as Léon Benouville's Esther with Odalisque (1844), Ingres' Odalisque with a Slave (1842), and Charles Jalabert's Odalisque (1842). Comparison is also made to Ingres' Grande Odalisque (1814).  Manet did not depict a goddess or an odalisque but a high-class prostitute waiting for a client; it has often been argued that Titian did the same.

Homages 
A Modern Olympia, Paul Cézanne, c. 1873/74.
Olympia, René Magritte, 1948
Three Quarters of Olympia Minus the Servant, Jean-Michel Basquiat, 1982.
Untitled (Detail of Maid from Olympia), Jean-Michel Basquiat, 1982.
Crown Hotel (Mona Lisa Black Background), Jean-Michel Basquiat, 1982.
Portrait (Futago), Yasumasa Morimura, 1988.
Odalisque I. Looking at Manet. Olympia and A Family, Louis le Brocquy, 2005.
"Somms Recreating Old Masters: Series 1", Mark Shipway, c. 2015.

See also
 100 Great Paintings, 1980 BBC series

References and sources

References

Sources 

Ross King. The Judgment of Paris: The Revolutionary Decade that Gave the World Impressionism. New York: Waller & Company, 2006 . See pages 105–108.
Eunice Lipton.  Alias Olympia: A Woman's Search for Manet's Notorious Model & Her Own Desire.  Ithaca: Cornell University Press, 1999. 
V.R. Main. A Woman With No Clothes On. London: Delancey Press, 2008 .

External links 

 Olympia at the Musée d'Orsay
 Phylis A. Floyd, The Puzzle of Olympia
 Seibert, Margaret Mary Armbrust. A Biography of Victorine-Louise Meurent and Her Role in the Art of Édouard Manet. Diss. The Ohio State University, 1986.

1863 paintings
Black people in art
Paintings in the collection of the Musée d'Orsay
Erotic art
Paintings by Édouard Manet
Nude art
Cats in art
Prostitution in paintings
Obscenity controversies in painting
Race-related controversies in painting